This is a list of fossiliferous stratigraphic units in Azerbaijan.



List of fossiliferous stratigraphic units

See also 
 Lists of fossiliferous stratigraphic units in Europe
 List of fossiliferous stratigraphic units in Armenia
 List of fossiliferous stratigraphic units in Georgia
 List of fossiliferous stratigraphic units in Russia
 List of fossiliferous stratigraphic units in Turkey
 Lists of fossiliferous stratigraphic units in Asia

References 

 
.
 Azerbaijan
 Azerbaijan
Fossiliferous stratigraphic units